Sparna migsominea is a species of beetle in the family Cerambycidae. It was described by Gilmour in 1950. It is known from Colombia.

References

Colobotheini
Beetles described in 1950